Hugh John Whitemore (16 June 1936 – 17 July 2018) was an English playwright and screenwriter.

Biography
Whitemore studied for the stage at London's Royal Academy of Dramatic Art, where he was taught by Peter Barkworth, then on the staff at RADA, who recognised he had the potential to make a significant contribution to the theatre, "though perhaps not as an actor." He began his writing career in British television with both original television plays and adaptations of classic works by Charles Dickens, W. Somerset Maugham, Daphne du Maurier, and Charlotte Brontë, among others, and had won a Writers' Guild of Great Britain award twice. His work for American TV includes Concealed Enemies (1984), about the Alger Hiss case, and The Gathering Storm (2002), which focused on a troubled period in the marriage of Clementine and Winston Churchill just prior to World War II. He won an Emmy Award for each script. He was also nominated for his adaptation of the Carl Bernstein/Bob Woodward book about President Nixon, The Final Days starring Lane Smith as Nixon. Whitemore's last work for television was My House in Umbria (2003), an adaptation of the novella by William Trevor starring Maggie Smith. He also wrote the episode, "Horrible Conspiracies", for the BBC series Elizabeth R (1971).

Whitemore's film credits include: Man at the Top (1973), All Creatures Great and Small (1975), The Blue Bird (1976), The Return of the Soldier (1982), 84 Charing Cross Road (1987) and Utz (1992).

The plots of Whitemore's plays frequently focus on historical figures. Stevie (1977) centred on the life of English poet and novelist Stevie Smith and Pack of Lies (1983) covered events leading up to the arrest of the Krogers, two Americans spying for the Russians in London in 1961. Whitemore's best known work taking the form of a staged biography was Breaking the Code (1986) which was centered on Alan Turing, who was responsible for cracking the German Enigma code during World War II and resisted an adherence to the English code of sexual discretion with his homosexuality, for which he was charged with gross indecency. A television adaptation was broadcast in the UK in 1996. The Best of Friends (1987), about the friendship Dame Laurentia McLachlan, the Abbess of Stanbrook Abbey in Worcestershire, shared with George Bernard Shaw and Sydney Cockerell, director of the Fitzwilliam Museum in Cambridge. An adaptation by Whitemore of the Luigi Pirandello play As You Desire Me was staged at London's Playhouse Theatre in 2005 with Kristin Scott Thomas in the lead.

Whitemore was a Fellow of the Royal Society of Literature. He died at the age of 82 on 17 July 2018.

Notes

References
"Hugh Whitemore Biography (1936- )". Film Reference.  FilmReference.com, 1998.  Web.  30 March 2009.

External links
 
 

1936 births
2018 deaths
Alumni of RADA
English dramatists and playwrights
English screenwriters
English male screenwriters
Fellows of the Royal Society of Literature
People educated at King Edward VI School, Southampton
Fellows of King's College London
Place of birth missing
Primetime Emmy Award winners
English male dramatists and playwrights